On February 15, 2017, a suicide bomber targeted a government van carrying civil judges in Hayatabad. The attack was claimed by Tehrik-i-Taliban Pakistan.

References 

2017 murders in Pakistan
Suicide bombings in 2017
Suicide bombings in Pakistan
Terrorist incidents in Peshawar
Tehrik-i-Taliban Pakistan attacks
Terrorist incidents in Pakistan in 2017
February 2017 crimes in Asia
Hayatabad